Brookfield Property Partners L.P. is a global commercial real estate firm that is a publicly traded limited partnership and a subsidiary of Brookfield Asset Management, an alternative asset management company. Its portfolio includes properties in the office, multi-family residential, retail, hospitality, and logistics industries throughout North America, Europe, and Australia. Its subsidiary Brookfield Properties is responsible for the management of these facilities.

History
Brookfield Property Partners (BPY) was formed through a spin-off from Brookfield Asset Management in April 2013. On April 15, 2013, shares of BPY began trading on the Toronto and New York Stock Exchanges. The new company formed by the spin-off consolidated all of Brookfield's commercial property assets in one place. Between October 2013 and October 2014, BPY surpassed one million square feet of leasing deals in London.

In June 2014, BPY completed the acquisition of Brookfield Office Properties (BPO) through a tender offer. On June 10, 2014, BPO was de-listed from the Toronto Stock Exchange; ten days later, it was removed from the New York Stock Exchange.
   
Following a $300 million renovation, the company opened Brookfield Place, New York City's 375,000 square-foot retail space, in March 2015.
 
In a joint venture with Qatar Investment Authority, BPY completed the takeover of 100 percent of London's Canary Wharf Group (CWG) in April 2015. The deal acquired Songbird Estates Plc., which owned 69 percent of CWG, in a deal that valued Songbird at about 2.6 billion pounds ($3.9 billion US).
 
That same month, the company signed the law firm Skadden Arps to be the anchor tenant in its 2.1 million square-foot office tower in New York City, One Manhattan West.

In October 2015, BPY acquired a Brookfield residential development in Brooklyn called "Greenpoint Landing" and sold a 44% interest in the $8 billion Manhattan West development in New York to the Qatar Investment Authority.

Together with a joint venture partner, Korea Investment Corp., Brookfield Property Partners acquired Berlin's Potsdamer Platz in a deal valued at $1.41 billion in January 2016. The property is a major public square in central Berlin consisting of 17 buildings, 10 streets, and two squares covering over 2,900,000 square feet. The buildings are a mix of office, retail and residential space, including a hotel and leisure-use space.
  
Also in January 2016, Brookfield Property Partners, with a joint venture partner, Investment Corporation of Dubai, launched an office development project in Dubai, ICD Brookfield Place, in a deal valued at $1 billion.

Brian Kingston is the CEO of Brookfield Property Partners, and Ric Clark is the chairman of the company.

Property types and markets

Brookfield Property Partners operates real estate in multiple sectors including office, retail, industrial, hospitality, self-storage, student housing and developing markets.

Office 
Brookfield owns and operates office buildings in cities including New York, London, Toronto, Los Angeles, and Sydney. Some of the company's properties include Brookfield Place in New York and Bank of America Plaza in Los Angeles.

Retail 
Brookfield Property Partners operates retail properties in the U.S., Europe, Brazil and Asia.

In 2014, Brookfield signed a lease with  Hudson's Bay Company  , owners of Saks Fifth Avenue department stores, in downtown Manhattan.

In 2016, Brookfield acquired Rouse Properties, taking over 35 malls and retail centers in 21 states.

Brookfield first acquired an interest in GGP Inc. in 2016. In August 2018, Brookfield acquired the remaining shares of GGP.

Concurrent with the GGP deal, Brookfield acquired retail properties on Bleecker St. in Manhattan from New York REIT Inc. with plans to revitalize the area. The company's plans included creating an incubator for online and emerging retailers, and hosting cultural events and art installations within the storefront spaces.

Industrial property

In 2012, Brookfield entered the industrial-property sector. Between 2012 and 2014, BPY purchased Atlanta-based Industrial Developments International and London-based Gazeley Ltd, industrial-property companies focused on the US, UK, Europe and Asia. The companies were subsequently merged and now operate as a single entity, IDI Gazeley.

Multifamily

Between 2010 and 2015, BPY went from owning virtually zero apartment units to the acquisition of 42,000. The company began developing this market when it bought a 65 percent share in the Fairfield Residential Company.  Together with Fairfield, BPY launched the Brookfield Fairfield U.S. Multifamily Value Add Fund, which is pursuing investment opportunities to acquire undervalued or underperforming multifamily apartment properties in infill or supply-constrained locations suitable for renovation, repositioning and operational turnaround. In 2015, a Brookfield-sponsored fund acquired Associated Estates Realty Corp. for $2.5 billion, adding to its multifamily portfolio 15,000 units across 10 U.S. states.

Hospitality

In 2014, the company expanded into the hospitality-property market with the acquisition of Thayer Lodging Group, one of the few private-equity firms that focuses on hotel investment.  In 2015, a Brookfield-sponsored fund acquired Center Parcs UK, an operator of five short-break holiday villages in England, for £2.45 billion. Additionally, Brookfield is invested in other hotels including the Atlantis Paradise Island in the Bahamas, The Diplomat Resort & Spa in South Florida, and the Hard Rock Hotel & Casino in Las Vegas.

Triple Net Lease 
In 2014, a Brookfield-sponsored fund acquired Capital Automotive and its portfolio of 450 triple-net-leased automotive dealerships across the U.S. for $4.3 billion.

Self-storage 
In 2016, a Brookfield-sponsored fund acquired Simply Self Storage, an owner/operator of 90 self-storage facilities in the US totaling 6.8 million square feet, for $829 million. Through further acquisitions, Brookfield has doubled the size of its self-storage portfolio to 175 facilities totaling approximately 14 million square feet.

Student housing 
In 2016, a Brookfield sponsored fund acquired a portfolio of 13 student housing properties totaling 5,700 beds primarily in four university markets in the UK for a total purchase price of approximately £400 million.

Manufactured housing 
In 2017, a Brookfield-sponsored fund acquired a portfolio of 135 manufactured housing communities comprising 33,000 pads across 13 US states.

Developing markets

In recent years, Brookfield has been expanding into developing markets. In 2013, the company bought a stake in prime Shanghai Property from Shui On Land in the district of Xintiandi for $500 million. In late 2014, Brookfield acquired a portfolio of office parks in India.

In December 2015 and January 2016, Brookfield acquired seven office buildings in São Paulo and Rio de Janeiro, Brazil.   In 2016 Brookfield commenced construction in Dubai on ICD Brookfield Place, a 1.5 million square foot office and retail development located in the Dubai International Financial Centre district. In late 2016 Brookfield expanded into South Korea, when it acquired the International Finance Centre Seoul (IFC Seoul) featuring three high-rise office towers, a three-level retail mall, and a five-star Conrad hotel.

References

External links
 
 Brookfield Place New York

American companies established in 2013
2013 establishments in New York City
Companies based in Manhattan
Real estate companies established in 2013
Financial services companies established in 2013
Companies listed on the Nasdaq
Companies listed on the Toronto Stock Exchange
Companies formerly listed on the New York Stock Exchange
Publicly traded companies based in New York City
Commercial real estate companies
Real estate investment trusts of the United States
Brookfield Properties
Announced mergers and acquisitions
Corporate spin-offs
Brookfield Asset Management